{{Infobox film
| name = Sikuru Tharuwa
| image =
| caption =
| director = L. S. Ramachandran
| producer =John Edmund Amaratunga
| screenplay = P. K. D. Seneviratne
| starring = Punya Heendeniya  D. R. Nanayakkara  Shelton Silva
| music = Chandraratne Manawasinghe (lyrics)Karunaratne Abeysekera (lyrics) W. D. Amaradeva (music) R. Muttusamy (music)| cinematography =
| editing =
| distributor =
| country = Sri Lanka
| released = 
| runtime =
| language = Sinhala
| budget =
}}

Sikuru Tharuwa is a 1963 Sri Lankan drama directed by L. S. Ramachandran and written by P. K. D. Seneviratne. It was developed by the Kurulu Rana group that attempted to make original movies pertaining to Sinhalese culture.

Plot
The village headman of a small village is a drunkard and womanizer who is disliked by the village for his abusive ways. He hassles the heroine and other characters. At the end of the film he goes mad.

Cast
 Punya Heendeniya as Anula
 D. R. Nanayakkara as Village Headsman
 Nelson Karunagama as Teacher
 Shelton Silva as District Revenue Officer
 H. D. Kulatunga
 Millie Kahandawela
 S. A. Jamis
 Nelson Karunagama as Teacher
 Jessica Wickramasinghe
 Dharmadasa Kuruppu
 Francis Perera
 Wimala Amaradeva

Songs
"Ira Handa Payana Loke" – W. D. Amaradeva and chorus
"Oru Pade Pade Kiri Muhude" – Sujatha Perera and chorus
"Gamana Nonimeyi" – Narada Disasekera
"Himagiri Kandu Mudune" – S. Panibharatha and Wimala Gunaratne
"Kurulu Rahanakage Samagiya" – J. A. Milton Perera, Noel Guneratne and chorus

Production
 Development Sikuru Tharuwa was the second production of the John Edmund Amaratunga led Kurula Rana group after Kurulu Bedda''. Most of the cast and crew from the earlier film were again part of the production including the screenwriter P. K. D. Seneviratne, stars Punya Heendeniya and D. R. Nanayakkara and director L. S. Ramachandran.

Reception
The film was well received by audiences and local critics alike. Viewers hailed it the best Sinhalese film of the year in a newspaper poll and it was awarded seven national awards; Sarasaviya named D. R. Nanayakkara, Best Actor for the year of 1963. Critics praised the outdoor locations used in shooting and the original storyline about Sinhalese village life.

References

1963 films
Films set in Sri Lanka (1948–present)